Abdollah Fatemi Rika (born 16 September 1958) is an Iranian former weightlifter. He competed in the men's heavyweight I event at the 1992 Summer Olympics.

References

External links
 

1958 births
Living people
Iranian male weightlifters
Olympic weightlifters of Iran
Weightlifters at the 1992 Summer Olympics
Weightlifters at the 1986 Asian Games
Place of birth missing (living people)
20th-century Iranian people